Phricanthes eutrachys is a species of moth of the family Tortricidae. It is found on Sumatra, Indonesia.

References

Moths described in 1948
Phricanthini